The Carolina Band, or the Mighty Sound of the Southeast, is the official marching band of the University of South Carolina. This 400-member marching band performs at all South Carolina Gamecocks football games played at Williams-Brice Stadium and most football games outside of Columbia, including bowl games.

The band's pregame performance ends with theme from 2001: A Space Odyssey, as the Gamecocks run onto the field at the start of every game, which Sporting News once called "the most exciting pregame entry" in college football.

History 

The Carolina Band began as a student-initiated organization in 1920, when the request to organize a band was granted by the Board of Trustees. The first band was formed with fewer than 20 students in September 1921 under the direction of a student (Mr. Martin).

 1922: After the departure of Martin, James C. Lanham, another student at UofSC, assumed the director position through the 1922–23 school year.
 1923: George Olson was appointed director of the band, Olson was the first faculty member in charge of the band (was Dean of the School of Commerce). With 23 years, Olson was the longest serving director of the marching band itself. (Copenhaver is the longest serving overall director of bands; however he only directly oversaw the marching band for 21 years).

The World War II years (to 1945) 
Still under the direction of Olson, the band began to increasingly take on the appearance and the sound of a marching band. Olson's band were of the first to wear uniforms in the school colors and he offered participating students instruments for use in the band. Band membership totaled around 50 members.

Additionally, as the United States was engaged in the second world war, many members were lost from the university and the band to active duty requirements for World War II. In 1941, the formerly all-male band changed its policies to allow females into its members. The first female members only served as majorettes. Later, female members assumed positions as marching members of the band.

After World War II & the 1950s 
After World War II, the band began to develop more as a "show" band, with more elaborate pre-game and halftime shows. There were four different directors between 1946 and 1959.

 1946: Louis Albert Fink continued the V-12 Naval ROTC band style which was used by Olson in the latter part of his term. Additionally, the band began to travel to football games away from Columbia.
 1950: Richard H. Zimmermann served as director through 1955. Membership reached a peak of 82 members.
 1955: Donald L. Banschbach succeeded Zimmermann during the first time that Air Force ROTC, Navy ROTC and University bands all operating independently of each other.
 1956: Pat Garnett is known most widely for eliminating the majorettes from the band. He suffered a stroke in 1958 and ended his term as director in 1959.

1960s and 1970s 
The style of the Carolina Band can be traced to the appointment of James D. Pritchard as band director in 1959. Though a regimental marching band, Pritchard brought back the majorettes and feature twirlers, who had been absent from the shows of the preceding few years. Pritchard also acquired a recording studio, more storage & practice areas and created the "Coquettes", the official dance team of the marching band.

He also collaborated with then-athletic director and head football coach Paul Dietzel in creating the new school fight song, The Fighting Gamecocks Lead the Way, more commonly known as Step to the Rear.  The song is still used today.

1969: Ralph Wahl succeeded Pritchard with a four-year tenure. During this time, Wahl tripled the size of the Carolina Band to 350 members (which was the largest at that time).
1973: Thomas O'Neal, served as director for two years. O'Neal brought the band back under the jurisdiction of the Music Department. The tradition of post-game concerts by the Carolina Band began at this time.

Mid 1970s-1990 
In 1976, James K. Copenhaver, the longest-serving Director of Bands (now Director of Bands Emeritus), succeeded O'Neal. Copenhaver created the most well-known USC pre-game show (used from his tenure through the 2010 season). He also is responsible for the tradition of always having national or world champion twirlers as a part of the band.

The SEC years (1990–present) 
The Gamecocks were accepted as a member institution of the Southeastern Conference on September 25, 1990. They began to play during the 1992 season.  One change included the addition of third band director.  Under this organizational structure, the Director of Bands became responsible for administering the entire band program. The various athletic bands in the program were then overseen by an Associate and Assistant Director of Bands.

The new Assistant Director of Bands became the Director of Athletic Bands, which included direct oversight and instruction of the University of South Carolina Marching Band and pep bands. The first person to hold this position was Dr. David O' Shields. From 1995 until 2006, Dr. O'Shields's served as Assistant Director of Bands/Director of Athletic Bands at UofSC. O'Shields' tenure is highlighted by the demolition of the former Band Hall, the move to an Interim Band Hall, and the creation of plans for the new $9.8 million band facility complex which later opened in April 2009.

George Brozak became the new Assistant Director of Bands/Director of Athletic Bands in 2006. His tenure (2006–2009) leading the marching band is noted by the offering of scholarships for all Carolina Band members for the first time.

Steve McKeithen was hired as Assistant Director of Bands/Director of Athletic Bands from 2009 until 2011.

Following James Copenhaver's retirement in 2010, Dr. Scott Weiss was appointed Director of Bands at the University of South Carolina.

Rebecca Phillips was appointed Director of Athletic Bands in 2011 officially becoming the first Associate Director of Bands/Director of Athletic Bands with a new Assistant Director of Bands/Assistant Director of Athletic Bands Mr. Jayme Taylor.  For the 2014 season, Mr. Taylor served as the Interim Associate Director of Bands and Director of the Carolina Band along with Interim Assistant Director Mr. Stephen Meyer.

Starting with the 2015 season, Dr. Cormac Cannon became the new Associate Director of Bands/Director of Athletic Bands and Director of the Carolina Band.  In 2017, Dr. Tonya Mitchell-Spradlin was appointed Assistant Director of Bands/Associate Director of Athletic Bands.  

Following Dr. Cormac Cannon's appointment as Director of Bands at UofSC in 2019, Dr. Jay Jacobs was appointed the new Associate Director of Bands/Director of Athletic Bands.  In 2021, Dr. Quintus F. Wrighten, Jr. was appointed Assistant Director of Bands/Associate Director of Athletic Bands.

Fight songs

The Fighting Gamecocks Lead the Way (Step to the Rear) 
UofSC band director James Pritchard obtained a band arrangement of the song Step to the Rear from the Broadway musical How Now, Dow Jones in 1968 and the marching band played the song at the first game of the 1968 season.  It caught the ear of Coach Paul Dietzel who contacted Prichard about making it the official fight song of the University to replace the original fight song, Carolina Let Your Voices Ring.  Dietzel wrote the lyrics for the song, but asked that he remain anonymous because knowledge that the football coach wrote the lyrics might render it unacceptable to the basketball program.  The song was officially introduced on November 16, 1968 prior to the football game against Virginia Tech.

Facilities 
The home of the Carolina Band is on the University of South Carolina campus at 324 Sumter St.  On April 26, 2009, the University of South Carolina opened a facility dedicated to its 300-member marching band and a newly accredited dance program. The $9.8 million complex features practice areas, rehearsal rooms, storage for band instruments/uniforms and an adjacent 110-yard long practice field complete with field lighting and a three-story observation tower. The main level building plan is organized around a series of large practice areas and dance studios along the field-side to the north. Smaller offices and support spaces are located to the south.

Pep bands 

Men's and women's basketball and women's volleyball games feature the Carolina Basketball Band, the official pep band of the University of South Carolina.  This band performs at several home volleyball games and all men's and women's home basketball games hosted at the Colonial Life Arena.  This ensemble also travels with the basketball teams for both SEC and NCAA post-season tournaments.

References

External links 
Official website

University of South Carolina
Southeastern Conference marching bands
Musical groups from South Carolina
Musical groups established in 1921
1921 establishments in South Carolina